The Orin Jordan House is a Victorian house in Whittier, California that was built in 1888 by Orin Jordan.  Also known as the "Old Jordan House" and the "Whitaker Home", the house is located at 8310 S. Comstock Ave.

It was built as a  two-story ell-shaped wood-frame house, with nine rooms.

The Orin Jordan House was added to the National Register of Historic Places in 1980.

References

External links

 National Register of Historic Places

Victorian architecture in California
Houses completed in 1888
Houses on the National Register of Historic Places in California
Houses in Los Angeles County, California
Whittier, California
Buildings and structures on the National Register of Historic Places in Los Angeles County, California